Judah Klausner is an American composer and inventor. He developed and patented the Personal digital assistant (PDA) and electronic organizer. Klausner won settlements from Apple, Skype and LG Electronics.

References

Living people
Year of birth missing (living people)
20th-century American inventors
21st-century American inventors
American businesspeople